Yale Nance Patt is an American professor of electrical and computer engineering at The University of Texas at Austin.

Patt may also refer to:

People
 Harvey M. Patt (1918–1982), American physiologist, radiobiologist, and cell biologist
 Iddo Patt, filmmaker and television advertiser

Other
 Party All the Time, a song sometimes referred to as "PATT"
 Trentino Tyrolean Autonomist Party (Partito Autonomista Trentino Tirolese)